Kamil Karcz (born 19 August 1986 in Poland) is a Polish midfielder who plays for Polish Orange Ekstraklasa side Cracovia.

References

1986 births
Living people
MKS Cracovia (football) players
Polish footballers
People from Wadowice County
Sportspeople from Lesser Poland Voivodeship

Association football midfielders